The 2003 international cricket season was from April to September.

Season overview

April

Australia in the West Indies

TVS Cup Tri series

South Africa in Bangladesh

New Zealand in Sri Lanka

May

Bank Alfalah Cup

Zimbabwe in England

June

Sri Lanka in the West Indies

Pakistan in England

NatWest Series

July

Bangladesh in Australia

South Africa in England

August

Bangladesh in Pakistan

External links
 2003 season on ESPN Cricinfo

2003 in cricket